Antibody testing may refer to:

 Serological testing, tests that detect specific antibodies in the blood
 Immunoassay, tests that use antibodies to detect substances
 Antibody titer, tests that measure the amount of a specific antibody in a sample

Antibodies
Biological techniques and tools